Bartolomeo Bon (also spelled Buon; died after 1464) was an Italian sculptor and architect from Campione d'Italia.  His career spans the transition between Venetian Gothic architecture and the rather late start of Venetian Renaissance architecture.

Together with his father Zane Bon, he worked in Venice: they finished the decoration of the famous Gothic Ca' d'Oro (1424–1430) and the marble door of the Basilica di Santa Maria dei Frari. They were also entrusted with the construction of the Porta della Carta (1438–1442) at the Palazzo Ducale.

Bartolomeo alone worked at a portal of the Scuola Grande di San Marco (a lunette is now housed in the Victoria and Albert Museum in London), the portal of San Polo and the Porta della Carta, which connects the Ducal Palace to St. Mark's Basilica.

References

 Web Gallery of Art

15th-century deaths
15th-century Italian architects
Renaissance architects
Republic of Venice architects
1460s deaths
Year of birth unknown
16th-century Italian sculptors
Italian male sculptors